Pineville is an unincorporated community in White Township, Saint Louis County, Minnesota, United States, near Biwabik and Aurora. It is along State Highway 135 (MN 135) near County Road 138.

References

Unincorporated communities in Minnesota
Unincorporated communities in St. Louis County, Minnesota